Synodontis punctifer is a species of upside-down catfish endemic to Ivory Coast where it occurs in the Nzo and Bandama Rivers.  This species grows to a length of  TL.

References

External links 

punctifer
Freshwater fish of West Africa
Endemic fauna of Ivory Coast
Fish described in 1965
Taxa named by Jacques Daget